In mathematics, a Q-indescribable cardinal is a certain kind of large cardinal number that is hard to axiomatize in some language Q. There are many different types of indescribable cardinals corresponding to different choices of languages Q. They were introduced by .

A cardinal number κ is called Π-indescribable if for every Πm proposition φ, and set A ⊆ Vκ with (Vκ+n, ∈, A) ⊧ φ there exists an α < κ with (Vα+n, ∈, A ∩ Vα) ⊧ φ. Following Lévy, here one looks at formulas with m-1 alternations of quantifiers with the outermost quantifier being universal. 
Σ-indescribable cardinals are defined in a similar way. The idea is that κ cannot be distinguished (looking from below) from smaller cardinals by any formula of n+1-th order logic with m-1 alternations of quantifiers even with the advantage of an extra unary predicate symbol (for A).  This implies that it is large because it means that there must be many smaller cardinals with similar properties.

The cardinal number κ is called totally indescribable if it is Π-indescribable for all positive integers m and n.

If α is an ordinal, the cardinal number κ is called α-indescribable if for every formula φ and every subset U of Vκ 
such that φ(U) holds in Vκ+α there is a some λ<κ such that φ(U ∩ Vλ) holds in Vλ+α. If α is infinite then α-indescribable ordinals are totally indescribable, and if α is finite they are the same as Π-indescribable ordinals.  α-indescribability implies that α<κ, but there is an alternative notion of shrewd cardinals that makes sense when α≥κ: there is λ<κ and β such that φ(U ∩ Vλ) holds in Vλ+β.

Equivalent conditions
A cardinal is inaccessible if and only if it is Π-indescribable for all positive integers n, equivalently iff it is Π-indescribable, equivalently if it is Σ-indescribable.

Π-indescribable cardinals are the same as weakly compact cardinals.

If V=L, then for a natural number n>0, an uncountable cardinal is Π-indescribable iff it's (n+1)-stationary.

Relationships in the large cardinal hierarchy
A cardinal is Σ-indescribable iff it is Π-indescribable.  The property of being Π-indescribable is Π. For m>1, the property of being Π-indescribable is Σ and the property of being Σ-indescribable is Π. Thus, for m>1, every cardinal that is either Π-indescribable or Σ-indescribable is both Π-indescribable and Σ-indescribable and the set of such cardinals below it is stationary. The consistency strength is Σ-indescribable cardinals is below that of Π-indescribable, but for m>1 it is consistent with ZFC that the least Σ-indescribable exists and is above the least Π-indescribable cardinal (this is proved from consistency of ZFC with Π-indescribable cardinal and a Σ-indescribable cardinal above it).

Measurable cardinals are Π-indescribable, but the smallest measurable cardinal is not Σ-indescribable. However, assuming choice, there are many totally indescribable cardinals below any measurable cardinal.

Totally indescribable cardinals remain totally indescribable in the constructible universe and in other canonical inner models, and similarly for Π and Σ indescribability.

References 

 

Large cardinals